The 1992 Colgate Red Raiders football team was an American football team that represented Colgate University during the 1992 NCAA Division I-AA football season. Colgate tied for third in the Patriot League. 

In its fifth and final season under head coach Michael Foley, the team compiled a 4–7 record. T. J. Donahue and Joe Napoli were the team captains. 

The Red Raiders outscored opponents 287 to 199. Their 2–3 conference record tied for third place in the six-team Patriot League standings. 

The team played its home games at Andy Kerr Stadium in Hamilton, New York.

Schedule

References

Colgate
Colgate Raiders football seasons
Colgate Red Raiders football